This article contains a list of named passenger trains in the United States, with names beginning D through H.

D

E

F

G

H

References

North America (D-H)
 D-H
Named passenger trains